This is a list of rivers in Eswatini. This list is arranged by drainage basin, with respective tributaries indented under each larger stream's name.

Rivers

Komati River (Nkomanzi River)
Mlumati River (Lomati River)
Mbuluzi River (Imbuluzi River)
Black Mbuluzi River
White Mbuluzi River
Tembe River
Lusutfu River (Great Usutu River)
Pongola River (South Africa)
Lusushwana River (Little Usutu River)
Mzimene River
Mbabane River
Ngwavuma River
Mozane River
Nyetane River
Mhlatuze River
Mtendekwa River
Mhlatuzane River
Mzimphofu River
Mkondvo River (Assegai River)
Ngwempisi River
Polonjane River

References
CIA map, 1990
Army Map Service, 1961
 GEOnet Names Server

Eswatini
Rivers